The sixth and final season of the Fox musical comedy-drama television series Glee was commissioned on April 19, 2013, along with the fifth season, as part of a two-season renewal deal for the show on the Fox network. The final season, consisting of 13 episodes, premiered on Friday, January 9, 2015, with the first two episodes, and the last two episodes (functioning as a single series finale) aired on March 20, 2015.<ref name="TVG">{{cite web |url=http://www.tvguide.com/News/Glee-Final-Season-Following-Return-Date-1089558.aspx |title=Fox Announces Premiere Dates for Glee Goodbye, The Following Return |first=Kate |last=Stanhope |work=TV Guide |date=November 20, 2014 |access-date=November 21, 2014}}</ref>

The series features the New Directions glee club at the fictional William McKinley High School (WMHS) in the town of Lima, Ohio, and some of the graduates of McKinley. The season focuses on the former glee club member, Rachel Berry, who returns to McKinley after her TV pilot bombs to rebuild the disbanded glee club. The central characters are the former glee club director Will Schuester (Matthew Morrison), school principal Sue Sylvester (Jane Lynch), and Glee club graduates Rachel Berry (Lea Michele), Kurt Hummel (Chris Colfer), Blaine Anderson (Darren Criss), Artie Abrams (Kevin McHale), and Sam Evans (Chord Overstreet). Amber Riley returns to the main cast as Mercedes Jones and Dot-Marie Jones, who portrays Sheldon Beiste, the school's football coach, was promoted to the main cast after four years as a recurring character. Jenna Ushkowitz, Naya Rivera, Becca Tobin, Jacob Artist, Melissa Benoist, Blake Jenner, and Alex Newell who have portrayed, respectively, Tina Cohen-Chang, Santana Lopez, Kitty Wilde, Jake Puckerman, Marley Rose, Ryder Lynn, and Wade "Unique" Adams, were demoted from the main cast this season with Ushkowitz, Rivera, and Tobin recurring throughout the season, Newell appearing in one mid season episode then joining Artist and Jenner for a brief appearance in the series finale. Benoist does not appear at all in this season.

The season was nominated for one Emmy Award for Outstanding Original Music and Lyrics.

Episodes

Production
On April 19, 2013, Fox renewed Glee for a fifth and a sixth season, as part of a two-season renewal deal for the show. Ryan Murphy subsequently announced that season six would be the series' final season, that it wouldn't be New York-centric like the end of the fifth season, that there will be a time jump between the season five finale and the season six premiere, and that during the final season the show would revisit the younger McKinley High students who did not graduate in the fifth season. Season six premiered on January 9, 2015, as part of the 2014–15 television season. The 13 episodes were broadcast consecutively on Fridays at 9:00 p.m. (ET), with the beginning and ending double episodes starting an hour earlier.

Executive Music Producer Adam Anders began working on the music for the season on July 16, 2014, and on August 25 his brother Alex Anders was in the studio with Darren Criss doing the show's first cast member recording session of the season.

The season's first day of filming was September 3, 2014, which was revealed that day by co-executive producer Michael Hitchcock with a "Back to school" tweet accompanied by a photo of a first-episode call sheet; Lea Michele posted a picture of herself from the set that same day. Filming concluded on February 21, 2015. 

The final season follows former New Directions lead singer and Broadway star Rachel Berry (Michele) as she returns to Lima to relaunch the New Directions. The sixth season included the 700th song performance on the show, which took place in the sixth episode. On December 6, 2014, the EPs for the first two episodes of the season were posted on Amazon over a month before their scheduled release, including the episodes' titles "Loser Like Me" and "Homecoming". "Loser Like Me" included the songs "Uninvited", "Suddenly Seymour", "Sing", "Dance the Night Away" and "Let It Go". "Homecoming" included the songs "Take On Me", "Tightrope", "Mustang Sally", "Home" and "Problem". The EP for the third episode was posted on December 13, 2014, including the episode title "Jagged Little Tapestry". The episode included the songs "It's Too Late", "So Far Away", and three mash-ups: "Hand In My Pocket / I Feel the Earth Move", "Will You Love Me Tomorrow / Head Over Feet", and "You Learn / You've Got a Friend".

Cast
The main cast was reduced for the sixth season: Chris Colfer, Darren Criss, Jane Lynch, Kevin McHale, Lea Michele, Matthew Morrison, and Chord Overstreet continue from the previous season while Amber Riley returned to the main cast and Dot-Marie Jones was promoted to the main cast after four years as a recurring guest star.

Former previous main cast members who return as guest stars include Jenna Ushkowitz, Dianna Agron, Mark Salling, Jayma Mays, Naya Rivera, Heather Morris, Becca Tobin, Harry Shum Jr., Mike O'Malley, Alex Newell, Jessalyn Gilsig, Jacob Artist, and Blake Jenner. Past recurring guest stars returning during the season include Iqbal Theba, Lauren Potter, Max Adler, Gloria Estefan, Romy Rosemont, Brian Stokes Mitchell, NeNe Leakes, Ivonne Coll, Jonathan Groff, Vanessa Lengies, Ashley Fink, Samuel Larsen, and Dijon Talton.

Five new major recurring characters were introduced: Roderick (Noah Guthrie), a shy teenager with a good voice, Spencer Porter (Marshall Williams), a "post-modern gay" football player, Jane Hayward (Samantha Marie Ware), an ambitious girl who originally intends to join the Warblers, and twins Mason (Billy Lewis Jr.) and Madison McCarthy (Laura Dreyfuss), cheerleaders who are strange but positive. The Wanted's Max George plays Clint, the villainous new Vocal Adrenaline lead singer. Harry Hamlin guest starred as Walter, Kurt's brief love interest who is in his 50s. Josie Totah plays Myron Muskovitz, a spoiled but talented 13-year-old tween and Finneas O'Connell plays Alistair, the love interest for Spencer. Special guest stars include Ken Jeong and Jennifer Coolidge as Brittany's parents, and Gina Gershon as Blaine's mother. Michael Bolton, Geraldo Rivera, and Carnie Wilson appear as themselves. Carol Burnett reprises her role as Doris, Sue's mother, for the first time since the second season.

Reception

Critical response
The opening of the season was received with positive reviews from critics, most of them remarking how it reminds them of Glees first seasons. The sixth-season premiere was the lowest watched season premiere in the show's history, with a rating of 2.34 and in adults 18-49 the premiere scored a 0.7/2. 

The review aggregator website Rotten Tomatoes gives the sixth season a 72% with an average rating of 5.77/10, based on 18 reviews. The site's critics consensus reads, "The band plays on in a truncated final season that is a little daffier and overstuffed than where Glee'' began, but some disciplined storytelling and sweetly rendered character arcs harmonizes one grande finale that will hearten the New Directions' faithful."

Ratings

Live + SD Ratings

Home media releases

References

2015 American television seasons
 6